The Schiebel Camcopter S-100 is an Austrian unmanned aerial vehicle (UAV) using a rotorcraft design.

Design and development
Produced by the Austrian company Schiebel, it was developed from 2003 to 2005. It is powered by a  Diamond engine and can carry various payloads, such as electro-optics and infrared sensors.The primary radio link between ground station(s) occupy the 5030‐5091 MHz band. A secondary link in the UHF band would operate within 433.2125 MHz to 434.4625 MHz.

On 12 March 2012 Schiebel announced that it successfully tested a company-developed heavy-fuel engine interchangeable with the standard Diamond engine. This heavy-fuel engine allows for the use of JP-5, Jet A-1 or JP-8 jet fuels. These fuels, which are standard on marine vessels, are safer to store and handle than gasoline.

On 7 February 2013, Schiebel flight tested a Thales Group I-Master surveillance radar system on the Camcopter at its Wiener Neustadt, Austria, facility. The I-Master system, weighing , provides ground moving target indication and synthetic-aperture radar operations.

International customers

The launch customer for the S-100 was the UAE Army, which ordered 40 aircraft with an option for 40 more. The aircraft was ordered by three more undisclosed nations, with total orders reaching 200.

The Camcopter underwent sea trials on the Indian Navy's  during October 2007. Flight testing occurred aboard a Pakistan Navy Type 21 frigate in the Arabian Sea on 16 March 2008, with further naval testing on 14 April 2008 on the Spanish Guardia Civil vessel Rio Miño off Gran Canaria.

The German Navy conducted testing during three weeks in August and September 2008 on the s Braunschweig and Magdeburg, respectively. More than 130 takeoffs were conducted, and the UAV maintained unaided on-deck stability in greater than 15° flight deck roll conditions.

The French Navy performed test flights during September and October 2008, with a Camcopter spending four days on a barge in the Atlantic Ocean and a further three days on the frigate Montcalm (D642).

Libya ordered four Camcopters in 2009, which were placed under command of the Khamis Brigade.

Jordan ordered two S-100s with L3Harris Wescam MX-10 EO-IR payloads in July 2010 and accepted delivery in February 2011.

In November 2011 the Camcopter demonstrated flights from the French  L'Adroit. At the same time, the Gorizont (Horizon) Air S-100, a Russian license-built version of the UAV was successfully tested aboard the Coast Guard patrol cutter Rubin. Russia intends to equip all s with these UAVs.

In 2010 the Chinese Navy purchased 18 of these systems. Two years later, in May 2012, an unmanned UAV believed to be a Camcopter S-100 was photographed operating from the fantail of a Chinese Type 054A frigate.

In April 2012, the Camcopter became the first unmanned helicopter to fly from an Italian Navy vessel when it was flight tested from the MM Bersagliere (F-584). In February 2014, the Italian Navy chose the S-100 as its primary unmanned aerial system for shipboard operations, where it will be used for intelligence, surveillance and reconnaissance (ISR). It will additionally support other activities, such as search and rescue and natural disaster recovery. They are currently assigned to the 4° Gruppo Elicotteri (4th Helicopter Sqn.) based at the Grottaglie Naval Air Station near Taranto.

In December 2014, the Camcopter went through a series of trials in Bizerte, Tunisia, to serve within the Tunisian Army. Schiebel selected the Italian company Leonardo to supply AESA-based SAR radar for the systems which were to enter service in 2017.

In February 2017, the Royal Australian Navy awarded a contract to provide an unrevealed number of Camcopter systems, plus three-years support. The type is operated by 822X Squadron RAN, which is responsible for trialling UAVs.

In 2018, the Belgian Navy conducted a weeks-long testing of the Camcopter, assessing its utility for maritime surveillance and search and rescue.

In early 2023, the Royal Navy selected the system for operations in an intelligence-gathering, surveillance and reconnaissance role. To be named Peregrine in Royal Navy service, it is initially intended to begin operations in the Persian Gulf in mid-2024.

Airframe losses
On 10 May 2012, an Austrian engineer from Schiebel was killed and two South Korean colleagues were injured when a Camcopter S-100 crashed into their control vehicle during a test flight in the South Korean city of Incheon.

On 25 August 2015, forces in Yemen shot down a Camcopter S-100 operated by the United Arab Emirates Army in the area of Mukayris of southern Yemen.

On 28 August 2020, a Camcopter S-100 owned by the European Maritime Safety Agency and operated by the Croatian Ministry of Maritime Affairs, Transport and Infrastructure crashed shortly after takeoff from Brač Airport, causing a fire which destroyed  of macchia. No injuries were reported.

On 20 April 2022, It falsely claimed that the Ukrainian forces shot down a Horizon Air S-100 operated by the Russian Armed Forces using a Man-portable air-defense system. The images showed a wreckage of a Russian VM-V helicopter target (decoy) with its manufacturer АО ЦНТУ «Динамика» written on the plate.

Operators

Military users

 (from mid-2024)

Non-military users

Ministry of Maritime Affairs, Transport and Infrastructure

Finnish Border Guard

 Migrant Offshore Aid Station
 Organization for Security and Co-operation in Europe

 Romanian Border Police

 Russian Coast Guard

 HM Coastguard

Nordic Unmanned

Specifications

See also

References

External links

 Camcopter S-100 at Schiebel.net

Camcopter S-100
2000s Austrian military reconnaissance aircraft
Military helicopters
Unmanned helicopters
Unmanned military aircraft of Austria
2000s Austrian helicopters
Wankel-engined helicopters
Rotary-engined aircraft